Anopheles gigas is a species complex of mosquito belonging to the genus Anopheles. It is endemic to Sri Lanka. Two subspecies recorded.

Subspecies
A. g. refutans
A. g. simlensis

References

External links
Mosquitoes by country

gigas
Insects described in 1901